The women's 3000 metres steeplechase competition at the 2018 Asian Games took place on 27 August 2018 at the Gelora Bung Karno Stadium.

Schedule
All times are Western Indonesia Time (UTC+07:00)

Records

Results
Legend
DNS — Did not start

References

External links
Results

Steeplechase women
2018 women